Partido  Manggagawa or Labor Party is a political party in the Philippines.

In the 2004 elections for the House of Representatives, it got 448,072 votes (3.5220% of the nationwide vote) and one seat (Renato Magtubo).

Electoral performance

House of Representatives party-list election

References

External links
Partido Manggagawa Facebook Page
Archived Mirror of the Old Website

Labor parties in the Philippines
Socialist parties in the Philippines
Party-lists represented in the House of Representatives of the Philippines